Joseph Albert Albertson (October 17, 1906 – January 20, 1993) was an American businessman, the founder of the Albertsons chain of grocery stores.

Early life
Born in Yukon, Oklahoma Territory, Albertson was one of four sons born to Rhoda and Earl Albertson. In 1909, before he was three, the family moved west to Caldwell, Idaho.

After graduation from Caldwell High School in 1925, Albertson studied business for two years at the College of Idaho in Caldwell.

Career
While in college in 1927, he began his career in the grocery industry as a clerk at a local Safeway grocery store. On the final day of 1929, he married his college classmate Kathryn McCurry, of Boise, Idaho. They had one daughter, Barbara Jean Albertson Newman (1933–2012).

Albertson quickly moved through the ranks with Safeway, until he was supervising more than a dozen stores. But he was not satisfied and wanted to start his own store—one that he could build to his own specifications and manage his own way. With $5,000 of the money he and Kathryn had saved, and with $7,500 borrowed from his wife's aunt, Albertson formed a partnership with L.S. Skaggs, a former Safeway division manager, and Tom Cuthbert, Skaggs' accountant. At the age of thirty-two, Albertson opened his first store in 1939 on three principles: quality, good value, and excellent service. Albertson is credited as being one of the pioneers of the complete one-stop, self-service supermarket concept.

The first store was located at Sixteenth and State Streets in Boise, and he opened his second and third Albertsons stores in Nampa and Caldwell in 1940. During the years of World War II, when food was being rationed, he filled the empty shelves with health and beauty products, general household goods, and other non-food items. Albertson's reputation for generosity and community involvement grew during those war years. His stores promoted war bonds and sponsored scrap drives that collected aluminum, steel, fats, and paper for recycling.

During the 1950s and 1960s, Albertson's expanded and became a familiar name to shoppers throughout the western United States. It grew to be a chain of over six hundred stores. At age 70, he stepped down as chairman of the board in 1976.

Albertson's generosity continued throughout the years. The College of Idaho received many donations from Joe and Kathryn. It was named Albertson College of Idaho for sixteen years from 1991 to 2007. Perhaps the most obvious gift to the citizens of Idaho is the  Kathryn Albertson Park in Boise, with its winding walkways, wildflowers, trees and ponds.

J.A. and Kathryn Albertson Foundation
In 1966, Joe and Kathryn established the J.A. and Kathryn Albertson Foundation as a way to administer their own charitable giving. They began focusing their giving primarily on education, which was important to Joe and Kathryn because neither was able to finish college during the Great Depression. Since then, the foundation has given more than $750 million to Idaho's communities. The foundation continues to give in areas where Joe and Kathryn lived or worked in Idaho. They are committed to accelerating opportunities in Idaho and focus on initiative work that is related to learning, leadership, and community.

References

External links
The College of Idaho - a brief history from its official website
J.A. and Kathryn Albertson Foundation

1906 births
1993 deaths
American businesspeople in retailing
People from Boise, Idaho
College of Idaho alumni
Idaho Republicans
People from Caldwell, Idaho
People from Yukon, Oklahoma
20th-century American businesspeople
American grocers
Philanthropists from Idaho
20th-century American philanthropists
Burials in Idaho